David Robertson (born 23 September 1986 in Livingston) is a Scottish former association footballer, who played as an attacking midfielder for  Dundee United, St Johnstone, Greenock Morton, Livingston, Ayr United, Selkirk and Cowdenbeath. He won the Scottish Cup with Dundee United in 2010 and represented the Scotland under-21 team. Robertson retired from football in January 2017 after being found in a civil trial to have committed rape with fellow footballer David Goodwillie.

Career

Dundee United
Livingston-born Robertson joined Dundee United as a youth player and was the top scorer in the 2004–05 SPL Youth League, despite playing from midfield. Robertson made his debut for United in January 2006, in the 1–1 draw against Aberdeen, when he came off the bench in the last few minutes to replace player/manager Craig Brewster who was injured while making his second debut. Robertson scored his first goal three months later in 3–1 league defeat to Livingston, and his late extra-time winner sent United through to the Scottish League Cup third round at the start of the following season. Further league goals came against Inverness Caledonian Thistle (twice) and Celtic, with a cup strike against St Mirren ensuring that Robertson's goals in 2006–07 saw him never finish on the losing side. Indeed, Robertson's form saw him sign a new two-year contract during February of that season.

In September 2007, Robertson won his first Scotland under-21 cap and later that season came on as an extra-time substitute in the 2008 Scottish League Cup Final against Rangers, missing one of United's penalties in the defeat. In January 2009, Robertson signed a further extension to his contract, committing himself to the club until May 2011. On 24 March 2010, Robertson scored a vital last minute winner against Rangers in the quarter-final of the Scottish Cup, which Dundee United went on to win for only the second time in their 100-year history. In the 2010 Scottish Cup Final Robertson played as a substitute.

St Johnstone
Despite being offered a new contract by United in 2011, Robertson opted instead to sign for St Johnstone. Robertson made his debut for St Johnstone in a league game against Aberdeen on 23 July 2011.

On 28 November 2012, Robertson was injured during St Johnstone's match against Hibernian and the following day, it was confirmed by the club's manager Steve Lomas that Robertson had broken his leg.

On 13 December 2013, St Johnstone announced that Robertson would not be given a new contract when his current deal expired. In December 2013, Robertson went on trial at Greenock Morton.

Greenock Morton
On 3 January 2014, Robertson signed for Greenock Morton.

Robertson's father Dougie played almost 200 games for Morton between 1983 and 1990.

Livingston and Ayr United
In the summer of 2014 Robertson left Morton to sign for Livingston. He scored on his competitive debut for the club, coming on in the 112th minute against Queen of the South and scoring just minutes later to secure the extra-time victory.

After seven months with Livingston, Robertson transferred to Scottish League One side Ayr United on a short-term deal. At the end of the 2014–15 season, Robertson was released by The Honest Men.

Selkirk and Cowdenbeath
On 18 December 2015, Robertson signed for Lowland League club Selkirk. After six months with Selkirk, Robertson returned to the SPFL, signing for Scottish League Two side Cowdenbeath in June 2016. Robertson retired from football in January 2017, after a judge ruled that he had raped a woman.

Rape judgement
Robertson and David Goodwillie, who was then a teammate of Robertson at Dundee United, were accused of raping a woman in January 2011. Goodwillie was charged with rape, but the Scottish legal authorities decided not pursue a criminal prosecution. The woman then took a civil action against Robertson and Goodwillie. On 17 January 2017, Robertson and Goodwillie were ruled to be rapists and ordered to pay £100,000 in compensation. The civil case was judged on the balance of probabilities and did not need corroboration of evidence, unlike in a Scottish criminal case. Robertson's club, Cowdenbeath, issued a statement indicating that he would not be considered for selection until further information had been received and considered. Robertson subsequently announced his retirement from football. In November 2017, three appeal judges at the Court of Session upheld the ruling. They avoided paying any of the compensation due by declaring bankruptcy.

Career statistics

Honours
Dundee United
 Scottish Cup: 2010
 Scottish League Cup: runner-up 2007–08

References

External links

1986 births
Dundee United F.C. players
Living people
Scottish footballers
Scottish Premier League players
Scotland under-21 international footballers
Sportspeople from Livingston, West Lothian
Association football midfielders
St Johnstone F.C. players
Scotland youth international footballers
Footballers from West Lothian
Scottish Professional Football League players
Greenock Morton F.C. players
Livingston F.C. players
Ayr United F.C. players
Cowdenbeath F.C. players
Selkirk F.C. players
Lowland Football League players
Rape in Scotland